In molecular biology, the DmpG-like communication domain is a protein domain found towards the C-terminal region of various aldolase enzymes. It consists of five alpha-helices, four of which form an antiparallel helical bundle that plugs the C terminus of the N-terminal TIM barrel domain. The communication domain is thought to play an important role in the heterodimerisation of the enzyme.

This domain heterodimerises with acetaldehyde dehydrogenases to form a bifunctional aldolase-dehydrogenase.

References

Protein domains